Jackson Thomas Williams (born May 14, 1986) is an American former professional baseball catcher. He played in Major League Baseball (MLB) for the Colorado Rockies and San Francisco Giants in 2014 and 2015.

Career

Amateur
Williams played college baseball at the University of Oklahoma. In 2005, he played collegiate summer baseball with the Yarmouth–Dennis Red Sox of the Cape Cod Baseball League, and returned to the league in 2006 to play for the Hyannis Mets.

San Francisco Giants
Williams was drafted by the San Francisco Giants in the first round of the 2007 Major League Baseball Draft. He played in the Giants organization until 2013 without making the majors.

Colorado Rockies
He signed a minor league deal with the Colorado Rockies before the 2014 season.

Williams was called up to the majors for the first time on June 22, 2014.

Los Angeles Angels of Anaheim
Williams was claimed off waivers by the Los Angeles Angels of Anaheim on October 22, 2014.

Second Stint with Giants
He never appeared in an MLB game for the Angels, and was purchased by the San Francisco Giants (the team who originally drafted him in the first round in 2007) on March 17, 2015. As a September callup, Williams appeared in 7 games for the Giants, with 2 hits and 4 walks in 14 plate appearances.

Second Stint with Rockies
On November 10, 2015, Williams signed as a free agent with the Colorado Rockies.

Pittsburgh Pirates
He elected free agency on November 6, 2017. On December 24, 2017, Williams resigned a minor league deal with the Pittsburgh Pirates. He became a free agent after the 2018 season.

References

External links

Oklahoma Sooners bio

1986 births
Living people
Sportspeople from Tulsa, Oklahoma
Baseball players from Oklahoma
Major League Baseball catchers
Colorado Rockies players
San Francisco Giants players
Oklahoma Sooners baseball players
Yarmouth–Dennis Red Sox players
Hyannis Harbor Hawks players
Salem-Keizer Volcanoes players
Augusta GreenJackets players
San Jose Giants players
Connecticut Defenders players
Richmond Flying Squirrels players
Fresno Grizzlies players
Colorado Springs Sky Sox players
Hartford Yard Goats players
Albuquerque Isotopes players
Altoona Curve players
Indianapolis Indians players